The Stage 43 Theatrical Society is a community theatre company in the Tri-Cities area of British Columbia. Stage 43's home theatre is the Evergreen Cultural Centre in Coquitlam.

Stage 43 was founded in 1982, and the current President is Claire Pinkett. The company performs approximately three to four major productions per season, regularly featuring comedies, mysteries, and dramas.

References

External links
Official website

Culture of Coquitlam
Theatre companies in British Columbia
Community theatre